Luis Orrego Luco (May 18, 1866, Santiago - December 3, 1948) was a Chilean politician, lawyer, novelist and diplomat. He served as Minister of Justice from 1918 to 1919 and as a member of the Chamber of Deputies of Chile from 1918 to 1921, representing the Radical Party. He took part in the Chilean Civil War of 1891 as a regimental commander on the Congressist side.

His older brother, Alberto, was a well-known painter.

Published works
Among his novels include 
"A New Idyll" (1892), "Santiago" (1900)
"On Family, Memories of Old Time" (1912)
"Through the Storm: Memories of Old Time: The Revolution 1891 "(1914)
"Stem Wounded: Scenes of Life in Chile "(1929)
"Playa Negra: Scenes of Life in Chile "(1947).

1866 births
1948 deaths
People from Santiago
Chilean people of Portuguese descent
Radical Party of Chile politicians
Chilean Ministers of Justice
Members of the Chamber of Deputies of Chile
Chilean diplomats
Chilean journalists
Male journalists
Chilean male writers
People of the Chilean Civil War of 1891
University of Chile alumni
19th-century Chilean lawyers
20th-century Chilean lawyers